The 2019 All-Ireland Senior Hurling Championship was the 132nd staging of the All-Ireland Senior Hurling Championship, the Gaelic Athletic Association's premier inter-county hurling tournament, since its establishment in 1887. The draw for the 2019 fixtures took place on 11 October 2018. The championship began on 11 May 2019 and concluded on 18 August 2019.

Limerick were the defending champions.

Carlow returned to the Leinster Championship for the first time since 2016, replacing Offaly who were relegated in 2018. Carlow lost all their four games in 2019 and were automatically relegated to the 2020 Joe McDonagh Cup.

Tipperary were the winners, defeating Kilkenny in the final.

Competition format

The current All-Ireland hurling championship format featuring five-team groups in both Leinster and Munster and the two Joe McDonagh Cup finalists was introduced in 2018 for an initial three-year period.

All-Ireland championship

In the Leinster and Munster provincial championships, five teams compete in single round-robin matches, home or away. The top two teams in each provincial group contest the provincial final, with the provincial winners advancing to the two All-Ireland semi-finals and the losing provincial finalists advancing to the two quarter-finals.	

The third-placed teams in Leinster and Munster compete in All-Ireland preliminary quarter-finals against the two Joe McDonagh Cup finalists with the Joe McDonagh Cup teams having home advantage.

Promotion and relegation in Leinster or Munster championships

If a non-Munster team wins the Joe McDonagh Cup, the bottom team in the Leinster championship is relegated to next year's Joe McDonagh Cup and is replaced in next year's Leinster championship by the Joe McDonagh Cup winners. This arrangement allows teams from Connacht and Ulster to gain promotion to the tier 1 championship.

If a Munster team wins the Joe McDonagh Cup, they playoff against the team that finished bottom in the Munster championship for the right to play in next year's Munster championship, thereby ensuring that only Munster teams compete in the Munster hurling championship.

Teams
A total of twelve teams compete in the championship – five in the Leinster championship, five in the Munster championship, and the two Joe McDonagh Cup finalists who enter at the preliminary quarter-final stage.

Teams and venues
Each team has a nominal home stadium for the round-robin series of the provincial championships.

In the knockout stage, teams from the provincial round-robin series will not have home advantage, if avoidable. The only teams to play knockout games at home are the two Joe McDonagh Cup finalists, who have home advantage in the preliminary quarter-finals. The Munster final was held at a neutral venue which was decided based on the qualifying teams, while the locations of the two quarter-finals were decided based on similar considerations. The Leinster final, and the semi-finals and final of the All-Ireland series are held in the 82,300-capacity Croke Park in Dublin, headquarters of the GAA.

Personnel and colours

Summary

Championships

Provincial championships

Leinster Senior Hurling Championship
 

{| class="wikitable" 
!width=20|
!width=150 style="text-align:left;"|Team
!width=20|
!width=20|
!width=20|
!width=20|
!width=30|
!width=50|
!width=20|
!width=20|
|- style="background:#ccffcc"
|1||align=left| Kilkenny||4||2||1||1||8-85||5-76||18||5
|- style="background:#ccffcc" 
|2||align=left| Wexford ||4||1||3||0||4-84||2-75||15||5
|- style="background:#FFFFE0"
|3||align=left| Dublin||4||2||1||1||7-84||5-79||11||5
|- style="background:#FFFFFF"
|4||align=left| Galway ||4||2||1||1||4-84||6-75||3||5
|- style="background:#ffcccc"
|5||align=left| Carlow (R) ||4||0||0||4||3-64||8-96||–47||0
|}
Carlow are relegated to the Joe McDonagh Cup for 2020, because the winners of the 2019 Joe McDonagh Cup were from Leinster (Laois).

Munster Senior Hurling Championship
 

{| class="wikitable" 
!width=20|
!width=150 style="text-align:left;"|Team
!width=20|
!width=20|
!width=20|
!width=20|
!width=35|
!width=50|
!width=20|
!width=20|
|- style="background:#ccffcc"
|1||align=left| Tipperary ||4||4||0||0||8-101||1-80||42||8
|- style="background:#ccffcc"
|2||align=left| Limerick ||4||2||0||2||4-92||2-71||27||4
|- style="background:#FFFFE0"
|3||align=left| Cork ||4||2||0||2||6-98||7-87||8||4
|-
|4||align=left| Clare ||4||2||0||2||3-73||6-89||-25||4
|- 
|5||align=left| Waterford ||4||0||0||4||2-67||7-104||-52||0
|}
Waterford did not need to play a relegation-playoff to avoid relegation to the Joe McDonagh Cup for 2020, because the winners of the 2019 Joe McDonagh Cup were from Leinster (Laois).

Joe McDonagh Cup

The second ever Joe McDonagh Cup, the second tier of senior inter-county championship hurling, was contested by Antrim, Kerry, Laois, Offaly and Westmeath in 2019. Each team plays the other four teams once in a round-robin format. The top two teams compete in the Joe McDonagh Cup final and also advance to the two All-Ireland preliminary quarter-finals, where they play the teams that finish third in the Leinster and Munster championships.

 Promotion to the All-Ireland senior hurling championship

 If the Joe McDonagh champions from Connacht, Leinster or Ulster they are promoted directly to the Leinster Championship for 2020.
 If the Joe McDonagh champions are from Munster they compete in a relegation-promotion playoff against the bottom team in the Munster Championship.

{| class="wikitable" style="text-align:center"
!width=20|
!width=150 style="text-align:left;"|Team
!width=20|
!width=20|
!width=20|
!width=20|
!width=50|
!width=50|
!width=20|
!width=20|
|- style="background:#FFFFE0"
|1||align=left| Laois (Q)||4||3||1||0||12-85||6-83||+20||7
|- style="background:#FFFFE0"
|2||align=left| Westmeath (Q) ||4||2||1||1||6-85||2-78||+19||5
|-   
|3||align=left| Antrim ||4||2||0||2||7-82||6-85||0||4
|- 
|4||align=left| Kerry ||4||2||0||2||3-74||11-68||-18||4
|- style="background:#ffcccc"  
|5||align=left| Offaly (R)||4||0||0||4||8-69||11-81||-21||0
|}

Laois defeated fellow Leinster county Westmeath in the 2019 Joe McDonagh Cup final. Laois were promoted to the 2020 Leinster Championship, while both teams advanced to the All-Ireland preliminary quarter-finals.

All-Ireland Senior Hurling Championship

Bracket

All-Ireland preliminary quarter-finals 
The third-placed teams in the Leinster and Munster championships play the two teams who competed in the Joe McDonagh Cup Final, with the two Joe McDonagh finalists having home advantage. The Joe McDonagh champions, Laois, face third-placed Leinster team, Dublin, in the first preliminary quarter final, while the runners-up, Westmeath, meet Cork, the third-placed team from Munster, in the other preliminary quarter final.

All-Ireland quarter-finals 
The beaten Leinster and Munster finalists play the winners of the two preliminary quarter-finals. If a third-place finisher from a provincial round-robin wins their preliminary quarter-final, they will be kept apart from the team they have already met in the round-robin phase to prevent a repeat fixture. Both games are held at neutral venues.

All-Ireland semi-finals 

The Leinster and Munster champions play the winners of the two quarter-finals. The semi-finals take place in Croke Park in the last weekend of July.

All-Ireland final

Championship statistics

Top scorers

Top scorers overall

Top scorers from open play

Top scorers in a single game

Scoring Events
Widest winning margin: 23 points
 Cork 1-40 – 0-20 Westmeath (preliminary quarter-final)
Most goals in a match: 5
Kilkenny 2-22 – 3-20 Galway (Leinster SHC)
Kilkenny 2-27 – 3-18 Cork (quarter-final)
Most points in a match: 60
 Cork 1-40 – 0-20 Westmeath (preliminary quarter-final)
Most goals by one team in a match: 3
Carlow 1-14 – 3-22 Kilkenny (Leinster SHC)
Clare 0-17 – 3-21 Tipperary (Munster SHC)
Kilkenny 2-22 – 3-20 Galway (Leinster SHC)
Kilkenny 2-27 – 3-18 Cork (quarter-final)
Tipperary 1-28 – 3-20 Wexford (semi-final)
Tipperary 3-25 – 0-20 Kilkenny (final)
Most goals without winning: 3
Kilkenny 2-27 – 3-18 Cork (quarter-final)
Tipperary 1-28 – 3-20 Wexford (semi-final)
 Highest scoring match: 63 points
 Cork 1-40 – 0-20 Westmeath (preliminary quarter-final)
Lowest scoring match: 32 points
Galway 0-16 – 0-16 Wexford (Leinster SHC)

Miscellaneous

 The Leinster Championship meeting between Carlow and Kilkenny was their first championship meeting since 20 June 1993.
 On 19 May, Patrick Horgan of Cork became only the fifth player ever to record a cumulative total of 400 points in the championship.
 Galway's Micheál Donoghue became the first manager to secure three victories over Brian Cody's Kilkenny in the championship.
 Kilkenny suffered their first home championship defeat at Nowlan Park since 1949.
 The Munster final between Limerick and Tipperary was their first meeting at this stage of the championship since 2001.
Wexford won their first Leinster championship since 2004, and reached the All-Ireland semi-finals for the first time since 2007.
The All-Ireland preliminary quarter-final was the first ever championship meeting between Cork and Westmeath.	
Laois reached the All-Ireland quarter-finals for the first time since 1979.
Cork scored forty points in the preliminary quarter-final against Westmeath, a record (they won 1-40 to 0-20). The previous record was 35, scored by Waterford against Offaly in 2017.
 Patrick Horgan scored a hat-trick for Cork against Kilkenny, but ended on the losing side. The last time this happened was Seamus Callanan in 2015, who scored a hat-trick for Tipperary as they lost to Galway.
 This is the very first time two teams beaten in their respective provincial finals meet at the Final stage.
 Tipperary become the first team to win two All-Ireland Senior Hurling Championships by qualifying back into the All-Ireland series through the back door system. The first time they achieved this feat was in 2010.

Live televised games 

RTÉ, the national broadcaster in Ireland, will provide the majority of the live television coverage of the hurling championship in the third year of a five-year deal running from 2017 until 2021. Sky Sports will also broadcast a number of matches and will have exclusive rights to some games.

Awards
Sunday Game Team of the Year
The Sunday Game team of the year was picked on 18 August, which was the night of the final.
The panel consisting of Brendan Cummins, Cyril Farrell, Jackie Tyrell, Ursula Jacob, Graeme Mulcahy, Derek McGrath and Enda Rowland picked Noel McGrath as the Sunday game player of the year while Kilkenny’s Adrian Mullen was selected as Young Hurler of the Year.	
	
 1. Eoin Murphy (Kilkenny)
 2. Sean Finn (Limerick)
 3. Ronan Maher (Tipperary)
 4. Cathal Barrett (Tipperary)
 5. Brendan Maher (Tipperary)
 6. Padraig Walsh (Kilkenny)
 7. Padraic Maher (Tipperary)
 8. Diarmuid O’Keeffe (Wexford)
 9. Noel McGrath (Tipperary)
 10. Lee Chin (Wexford)
 11. TJ Reid (Kilkenny)
 12. Colin Fennelly (Kilkenny)
 13. Aaron Gillane (Limerick)
 14. Seamus Callanan (Tipperary)
 15. Patrick Horgan (Cork)

All Star Team of the Year
On 1 November, the 2019 PwC All-Stars winners were presented at Dublin's Convention Centre. Séamus Callanan was named as the All Stars Hurler of the Year with Adrian Mullen named the All Stars Young Hurler of the Year.

References

 
2019 in hurling